LaToya Cantrell (née Wilder; born April 3, 1972) is an American politician serving as the Mayor of New Orleans, Louisiana since May 7, 2018. A Democrat, Cantrell is the first woman to hold the office. Before becoming mayor, Cantrell represented District B on the New Orleans City Council from 2012–2018.

Early life and education 
Cantrell was born as LaToya Wilder in Los Angeles. She moved to New Orleans in 1990  to attend Xavier University of Louisiana, where she earned a BA in sociology. She attended an executive training program at the Harvard Kennedy School.

Broadmoor neighborhood work 
Cantrell returned to New Orleans in 1999, settling in the Broadmoor neighborhood. In 2003, she joined the board of the Broadmoor Improvement Association and became president of the association in 2004. After the 2005 levee failures in Greater New Orleans following Hurricane Katrina, the Broadmoor neighborhood flooded severely and remained mostly deserted for months afterward. In early 2006, the Bring New Orleans Back Commission, a blue-ribbon panel convened by then-mayor Ray Nagin, released a recovery plan that called for Broadmoor and five other New Orleans neighborhoods to be converted into greenspace. In her role as president of the association, Cantrell worked with residents and local religious leaders to organize opposition to the panel's recommendation. She also helped enlist returning Broadmoor residents in a six-month effort to write a recovery plan for the neighborhood.

Cantrell worked full time to implement Broadmoor's recovery plan from 2006 through 2012. She and fellow residents formed the Broadmoor School Board, overseeing the reopening and renovation of the Andrew H. Wilson school. She served as a founding board member of the Broadmoor Development Corporation, a community development corporation that provided case management and other social services for returning residents. She was involved with residents' efforts to reopen Broadmoor's Rosa F. Keller Library, which won a $2 million grant from the Carnegie Endowment. She created a partnership between the Broadmoor Improvement Association and Church of the Annunciation, which provided the neighborhood association with office space and hosted volunteer groups. She also formed a partnership between the Broadmoor Improvement Association and her home parish, Blessed Trinity Catholic Church, to open the Broadmoor Art and Wellness Center.

Political career

New Orleans City Council 
In 2012, Cantrell declared her candidacy for the New Orleans City Council seat vacated when former District B representative Stacy Head won an election to an at-large position. After the November election, candidate Dana Kaplan and Cantrell advanced to a December runoff, which Cantrell won with 54 percent of the vote. Cantrell served out the balance of Head's term, and was unopposed for a full four-year term in 2014.

As a council member, Cantrell focused on health, housing, and criminal-justice issues. She introduced a bill banning smoking at restaurants and bars within New Orleans, citing the health effects of secondhand smoke on service industry workers. The council unanimously passed the bill in 2015.

Also in 2015, Cantrell began work to open a low-barrier homeless shelter, a move that was objected to by residents because of its proposed placement in Central City, New Orleans.  Instead, the shelter was moved to the downtown site of the former VA Hospital. In 2017, Cantrell introduced legislation with at-large council member Jason Williams to register and inspect rental units in the city.

As a member of the Criminal Justice Committee, Cantrell participated in efforts to install crime cameras in her district, assess the effectiveness of citywide anti-gun-violence campaigns, and address understaffing at the New Orleans Police Department.

2017 mayoral election 

Cantrell declared her candidacy for mayor of New Orleans in March 2017 in a race to replace term-limited mayor Mitch Landrieu. An open primary was held on October 14 and included 18 candidates. Cantrell garnered the most votes, winning 39% of the total. In the November 18 runoff election, Cantrell defeated fellow Democratic opponent Desiree Charbonnet, a former municipal judge, with 60% of the vote. She is the first woman to lead New Orleans in its 300-year history, as well as the first mayor not born in the city since Vic Schiro.

Mayor of New Orleans 
Cantrell was inaugurated as mayor on May 7, 2018, the first woman to hold the position in the city's history. Once in office, she established a new Office of Youth and Families, with the goal of creating a strategic plan to address families in crisis in the city. Cantrell also founded a Gun Violence Reduction Council, tasked with finding solutions to violent crime. Starting with a push to rededicate hotel taxes collected within the city for city use, Cantrell has focused on her #fairshare initiative to improve city infrastructure, public transportation, public parks, and green spaces. As part of that initiative, in October 2018 the City of New Orleans  filed a lawsuit against four opioid manufacturers and distributors.

During the 2019 session of the Louisiana Legislature, Cantrell negotiated the Fair Share Agreement with Governor John Bel Edwards and city, state, and tourism officials. The agreement secured $50 million in upfront funding for the city's infrastructure needs as well as $26 million in annual recurring revenue for the city. Following the approval of the Fair Share Agreement, New Orleans voters approved 3 of the 4 proposals Cantrell and the City Council put on the ballot in the 2019 general election.  Voters approved a $500 million bond sale and a tax on short-term rental properties, as well the establishment of a Human Right Commission under the New Orleans Home Rule Charter.

Awards 
In 2016, Cantrell was given a lifetime achievement award by the presidents of Tulane, Loyola and Xavier universities and the University of New Orleans for her service to the community.

2021 mayoral election 

Cantrell was re-elected to office by a wide margin in November 2021, securing 65% of the vote. Her campaign focused on the city's status in 2020 as a COVID-19 hotspot and her efforts, which at times were unpopular, to stop the disease's spread. She also stressed the need for higher-paying jobs for city workers, better public health outcomes and new technologies for the future of New Orleans.

In August 2022, a petition was filed to recall Mayor Cantrell by a political opponent and perennial political candidate, Belden Batiste.  The recall petition is currently being reviewed to verify that enough of the signatures are valid to trigger a recall.

Controversies 
According to NOLA.com, Latoya was found to be using tax-payer funded credit cards for personal expenses.  "New Orleans mayoral candidate LaToya Cantrell and her staff used her office's taxpayer-financed credit cards to cover almost $4,350 in purchases she repaid from her campaign funds -- sometimes years later, a review of her spending records show. Cantrell also charged to her City Council credit card $4,602 in meals and other expenses that she repaid with her own money after she entered the mayor's race."

Also according to NOLA.com, several liens were filed against Latoya, due to her and/or her immediate family owing upwards of $95,000 in back taxes.  "New Orleans Mayor LaToya Cantrell owes more than $95,000 to the Internal Revenue Service for unpaid taxes over the course of six years, according to liens filed by the agency against her home in Broadmoor."

Personal life 
Cantrell lives with her husband Jason and daughter RayAnn in New Orleans.

See also
 List of mayors of the 50 largest cities in the United States

References

External links 

 New Orleans City Council member profile

1972 births
21st-century American politicians
21st-century American women politicians
African-American mayors in Louisiana
Henry Crown Fellows
Living people
Louisiana Democrats
Mayors of New Orleans
New Orleans City Council members
Politicians from Los Angeles
Women city councillors in Louisiana
African-American city council members in Louisiana
Women mayors of places in Louisiana
Xavier University of Louisiana alumni
21st-century African-American women
21st-century African-American politicians
20th-century African-American people
20th-century African-American women
African-American women mayors